Palaquium rufolanigerum is a tree in the family Sapotaceae. The specific epithet rufolanigerum means "reddish woolly", referring to the indumentum.

Description
The bark is reddish brown. Inflorescences bear up to three brownish flowers.

Distribution and habitat
Palaquium rufolanigerum is endemic to Borneo. Its habitat is montane forests.

References

rufolanigerum
Endemic flora of Borneo
Trees of Borneo
Plants described in 1960